Herman Langelius (1614 – 1666), was a Dutch Protestant minister known best today for his portrait by Frans Hals.

Biography
He was born in Haarlem but was first called to Rotterdam. In 1654 he became bible corrector in Leiden along with L. Vinckius and Henricus Rulaeus. He later became a preacher in Amsterdam and was featured after his death there in a 12-page sermon called Last hours of Rivet, Bassecourt, Langelius and Landtman., by the Amsterdam preacher Casparus de Carpentier.

References
Herman Langelius in Amsterdam, in zyne opkomst, aanwas, geschiedenissen, voorregten ..., Volume 2, by Jan Wagenaar

1614 births
1666 deaths
17th-century Dutch Calvinist and Reformed ministers
Clergy from Haarlem
Frans Hals